Marie-Antoinette Demagnez (1869–1925) was a French sculptor who worked during the late 19th century and early 20th century. Demagnez was a frequent exhibitor at the annual Salon art exhibition in Paris, and was one of only a few women whose works were juried into the show at that time in history.

She is best known for her stone statue called Source d’amour and her monumental war memorial statue at Saint-Chaptes that memorializes soldiers killed in both the First and Second World War.

Demagnez died in Paris in 1925.

Early life and education
Demagnez was born in Paris, France, in 1869. During a time in history when very few women ventured into the male-dominated world of bronze sculpture, Demagnez’s work was deemed to be of such good quality that she broke the barrier and was allowed to exhibit her work in what was at the time arguably the world’s most important art show—the annual Salon exhibition. She studied sculpture under the direction of Antonin Mercié at the École des Beaux-Arts in Paris.

Career

Although perhaps best known for her World War I Memorial at Saint-Chaptes, she also produced a number of bust sculptures featuring prominent French citizens. Her circa 1895 stone sculpture entitled Mélancolie was described in 1902 by an art critic who said, "The work has delicate and thoroughly feminine sentiment, and is distinctly praiseworthy, albeit the execution shows marks of indecision and inexperience".

Demagnez won a bronze medal at the 1900 Exposition Universelle and also participated in the 1904 Louisiana Purchase Exposition (informally known as the St. Louis World’s Fair) where she presented a stone statue called Poetry.

Demagnez completed an important World War I memorial in 1919 that is now located in Languedoc-Roussillon, Gard, Saint-Chaptes, France, in the Town Hall Square. It is made of stone, concrete and iron.  It depicts a woman draped and crowned with laurel raising a palm with a soldier standing guard nearby.

Engraved on the bas-relief are the names of those soldiers from Saint-Chaptes that gave their lives for France in the First World War.  The concrete portion was edited by Coignet of Paris.  A plaque indicating the dead from this town in the Second World War was added sometime after that war ended in 1945.

Death
Demagnez died in Paris in 1925.

Signature example

References

Art Nouveau sculptors
19th-century French sculptors
20th-century French sculptors
Artists from Paris
1869 births
1925 deaths
French women sculptors
19th-century French women artists
20th-century French women artists